The 1981 Washington Huskies football team was an American football team that represented the University of Washington during the 1981 NCAA Division I-A football season.  In its seventh season under head coach Don James, the team compiled a 10–2 record, finished first in the Pacific-10 Conference, shut out Iowa in the Rose Bowl, and outscored its opponents 281 to 171.

Linebacker Mark Jerue was selected as the team's most valuable player; Jerue, James Carter, Vince Coby, and Fletcher Jenkins were the team captains.

Schedule

Roster

Game summaries

Washington State

    
    
    
    
    
    
    

The Cougars entered the Apple Cup with an  record and a road win over Washington at Husky Stadium would clinch the Pac-10 title and a Rose Bowl berth, WSU's first bowl game in  The Huskies prevailed at home, 23–10, for their eighth straight win over the Cougs, who were invited to the Holiday Bowl.

Conference leader UCLA lost by a point to rival USC, which gave Washington the Pac-10 title and Rose Bowl berth; the top five teams in the Pac-10 had two losses each in league play.

vs. Iowa (Rose Bowl)

Sources:

NFL Draft selections
Two University of Washington Huskies were selected in the 1982 NFL Draft which lasted twelve rounds with 334 selections.

References

Washington
Washington Huskies football seasons
Pac-12 Conference football champion seasons
Rose Bowl champion seasons
Washington Huskies football